The  was an army of the Imperial Japanese Army during the Second Sino-Japanese War.

History
The Japanese 11th Army was formed on July 4, 1938, under the Japanese Central China Area Army for the task of conquering and occupying the central provinces of China between the Yangtze River and the Yellow River. The 11th Army played a major role in the Battle of Wuhan. From September 1939, it came under the newly formed China Expeditionary Army and was transferred to the control of the Japanese Sixth Area Army in September 1944. It was disbanded at Quanzhou County (Guilin) in Guangxi province at the surrender of Japan.

List of Commanders

Commanding Officers

Chief of Staff

References

External links
 

11
Military units and formations established in 1938
Military units and formations disestablished in 1945